In the calculus of variations, a branch of mathematics, a Nehari manifold is a manifold of functions, whose definition is motivated by the work of  . It is a differentiable manifold associated to the Dirichlet problem for the semilinear elliptic partial differential equation

Here Δ is the Laplacian on a bounded domain Ω in Rn.

There are infinitely many solutions to this problem.  Solutions are precisely the critical points for the energy functional

on the Sobolev space . The Nehari manifold is defined to be the set of  such that

Solutions to the original variational problem that lie in the Nehari manifold are (constrained) minimizers of the energy, and so direct methods in the calculus of variations can be brought to bear.

More generally, given a suitable functional J, the associated Nehari manifold is defined as the set of functions u in an appropriate function space for which

Here J′ is the functional derivative of J.

References 
 A. Bahri and P. L. Lions (1988), Morse Index of Some Min-Max Critical Points. I. Applications to Multiplicity Results. Communications on Pure and Applied Mathematics. (XLI) 1027–1037.

Calculus of variations